Karaiyavetti is a village in the Ariyalur taluk of Ariyalur district, Tamil Nadu, India.

Demographics 

As per the 2001 census, Karaiyavetti had a total population of 2933 with 1463 males and 1470 females.

References 

Villages in Ariyalur district